KJDJ is a radio station in San Luis Obispo, California, United States, broadcasting on 1030 kHz AM. It is owned by Centro Cristiano Vida Abundante and is one of three California radio stations that broadcast its Radio Vida Abundante programming with a Spanish-language Christian radio format.

History
KJDJ began broadcasting February 8, 1988. The station was known as "1030 News Radio" and aired sporting events of the Cal Poly Mustangs.

KJDJ was sold in November 1992 to Jaime Bonilla Valdez, then-owner of KURS (1040 AM) in San Diego and future Governor of Baja California, Mexico, for $155,000. Bonilla then sold 30 percent to minority owners of that station. The new ownership changed KJDJ to a Spanish-language format. In 1995, KJDJ began to simulcast KRQK in Lompoc, and it changed in 1998 to Spanish-language talk from Radio Única.

In 2001, Bonilla leased KJDJ out to Radio Vida Abundante. Centro Cristiano Vida Abundante acquired KJDJ outright in 2007 for $652,000.

References

JDJ
Radio stations established in 1988
1988 establishments in California